Niort (Poitevin: Niàu;) is a commune in the Deux-Sèvres department, western France. It is the prefecture of Deux-Sèvres.

The population of Niort is 58,707 (2017) and more than 177,000 people live in the urban area.

Geography 
The town is located on the river Sèvre Niortaise and is a centre of angelica cultivation in France. Near Niort at Maisonnay there is one of the tallest radio masts in France (height: 330 metres).

Transport 
Niort has a railway station on the TGV route between Paris and La Rochelle, Gare de Niort. Direct TGV to Paris Montparnasse station takes 2 hours and 15 minutes. Niort is a road and motorway junction, connected to Paris and Bordeaux by the A10 motorway, with Nantes by the A83, and with La Rochelle by the N11. It is the largest French city to offer free mass transit.

Population

The population data in the table and graph below refer to the commune of Niort proper, in its geography at the given years. The commune of Niort absorbed the former commune of Souché in 1964, Sainte-Pezenne in 1965, Saint-Florent in 1968 and Saint-Liguaire in 1971.

Economy 
Niort is the French capital of mutual insurance and bank companies, with the headquarters of MAAF, MAIF, MACIF, SMACL and regional branches of national mutual companies such as Groupama, Banque Populaire. Niort is a main financial centre of France (fourth ranked after Paris, Lyon and Lille). Chemistry and aeronautics are the main industries.

Niort is a major administrative and commercial centre.

Notable people 
Niort is the birthplace of the following people:
Mickaël Brunet, footballer
Oliver Sarr, basketball player
Achille-Félix Montaubry (1826–98), tenor singer associated with opéra comique and operetta
Gaston Chérau (1872–1937), writer, a member of the Académie Goncourt
Aurélien Capoue, footballer
Étienne Capoue, footballer
Françoise d'Aubigné, marquise de Maintenon (1635–1719), second wife of Louis XIV
Henri-Georges Clouzot (1904–1977), film director
Paul Collomp (1885–1943), French hellenist and papyrologist
Julien N'Da, footballer
Louis-Marcelin, marquis de Fontanes (1757–1821), poet and politician
Mamadou Camara, footballer
Pascal Depierris (born 1967), former professional footballer
Isabelle Druet (born 1979), mezzo-soprano
Mickaël James (born 1976), former professional footballer
Jacques Antoine Marie de Liniers et Brémond (Santiago Antonio María de Liniers y Bremond) (1753–1810), Spanish Viceroy in the Río de la Plata
Jean Sauvaget (1901–1950), historian and orientalist
Philippe Souchard (born 1979), footballer
Mathieu Texier (born 1981), footballer

Fictional works 
Niort is featured or mentioned in the following fictional works:

Son Excellence Eugène Rougon, 1876, the sixth novel in the Rougon-Macquart series by Émile Zola.
Les Diaboliques, 1955 movie by Henri-Georges Clouzot
Sérotonine, 2019 novel by Michel Houellebecq

Sports 
The football team is Chamois Niortais, which plays in the Ligue 2, the second-highest league in French football. Rugby team Stade Niortais celebrated its 100th anniversary in 2009.
The city also is home to a professional basketball club named ASN Niort. The team plays at the second highest league in French basketball. The team celebrated its 100th birthday in 2021.

Education 

Upper secondary schools:

 Lycée Jean Macé
 Lycée général, technologique et professionnel Paul Guérin
 Lycée de la Venise Verte
 Lycée professionnel Gaston Barré
 Lycée professionnel Thomas Jean Main
 Lycée de l'horticulture et du paysage
 Lycée Saint-André / Notre-Dame (private)

There is a post-secondary institution, Pôle universitaire de Niort.

International relations 

Niort is twinned with:
  Atakpamé, Togo, since 1958
   Coburg, Bavaria, Germany, since 1974
  Wellingborough, Northamptonshire, England, United Kingdom, since 1977
   Springe, Lower Saxony, Germany, since 1979
   Tomelloso, Ciudad Real, Castilla-La Mancha, Spain, since 1981
   Gijón, Asturias, Spain, since 1982
  Biała Podlaska, Lublin Voivodeship, Poland, since 1995

Climate

See also 
 Château de Niort
 Communes of the Deux-Sèvres department
 Pierre-Marie Poisson Niort War Memorial
 Sérotonine (novel)

References

External links 

 
 Map
 Movies
 Calendar of Events
 Foirexpo of Niort
 Jobs

 
Communes of Deux-Sèvres
Prefectures in France
Poitou